Apac General Hospital, also Apac Hospital, is a hospital in the town of Apac, in Apac District, in the  Northern Region of Uganda.

Location
The coordinates of Apac General Hospital are:01°58'42.0"N, 32°32'01.0"E (Latitude:1.978325; Longitude:32.533618).

Overview
Apac General Hospital was established in 1968, with a capacity of 100 beds. It serves Apac District, and parts of the neighboring districts of Kiryandongo, Kole and Oyam. The hospital infrastructure is aged and crumbling. The hospital also faces a severe shortage of staff, being able to retain only three doctors out of the planned eight physician positions.

Renovations
During the 2015/2016 Financial Year, the Uganda Ministry of Health, allocated USh 500 million, to the renovation of Apac General Hospital. Repair work commenced on 2 December 2015 and were expected to be completed  by 1 April, 2016. The selected contractor is Midnorth Company Limited. The work involves he following:
1. Demolish old maternity ward 2. Build new maternity ward, including an antenatal wing 3. Repair the floor of the maternity ward, toilets and private rooms with Terrazzo tiles 4. Replace the electrical system of the hospital 5. Replace broken doors and windows.

See also
Hospitals in Uganda

References

External links
 Website of Uganda Ministry of Health

Hospital buildings completed in 1968
Hospitals in Uganda
Apac District
Lango sub-region
Northern Region, Uganda